The El Paso and Southwestern Railroad Depot is a historic building in Tucson, Arizona. It was designed in the Classical Revival style, and built in 1912 by the Phelps-Dodge Corporation. It was used as a railroad depot until 1924. In 1978, it was remodelled as a restaurant. It has been listed on the National Register of Historic Places since March 12, 2004.

References

Neoclassical architecture in Arizona
Commercial buildings completed in 1912
National Register of Historic Places in Pima County, Arizona
Railway depots on the National Register of Historic Places
1912 establishments in Arizona
Depot
Former railway stations in Arizona